Maksym Andriiovych Hirnyi (born 6 April 2001) is a professional Ukrainian footballer who currently plays for the Ukrainian club Munkach Mukachevo as a forward.

Club career

MFK Zemplín Michalovce
Hirnyi made his Fortuna Liga debut for Zemplín Michalovce against Slovan Bratislava on 11 August 2020.

References

External links
 
 UPL profile
 
 Futbalnet profile 

2001 births
Living people
Sportspeople from Lviv
Ukrainian footballers
Ukrainian expatriate footballers
Ukraine youth international footballers
Association football forwards
MFK Zemplín Michalovce players
Slovak Super Liga players
Ukrainian Second League players
Expatriate footballers in Slovakia
Ukrainian expatriate sportspeople in Slovakia
MFA Mukachevo players